The Eighteenth Oklahoma Legislature was a meeting of the legislative branch of the government of Oklahoma, composed of the Oklahoma Senate and the Oklahoma House of Representatives. The state legislature met in regular session at the Oklahoma State Capitol in Oklahoma City from January 7 to May 23, 1941, during the term of Governor Leon C. Phillips.

As Lieutenant Governor of Oklahoma, James E. Berry served as the President of the Senate. H. M. Curnutt served as the President pro tempore of the Oklahoma Senate. E. Blumhagen served as Speaker of the Oklahoma House of Representatives.

Dates of session
Regular session: January 7-May 23, 1941
Previous: 17th Legislature • Next: 19th Legislature

Party composition

Senate

House of Representatives

Leadership

Senate
As Lieutenant Governor of Oklahoma, James E. Berry served as the President of the Senate, giving him a tie-breaking vote and the authority to serve as the presiding officer. H. M. Curnutt of Barnsdall, Oklahoma, was elected by state senators to serve as the President pro tempore of the Oklahoma Senate, which gave him the authority to organize the Oklahoma Senate and to serve as the presiding officer.

House of Representatives
The Democratic caucus held the majority of seats in the Oklahoma House of Representatives in 1941, allowing them to elect E. Blumhagen of Watonga, Oklahoma, as the Speaker of the Oklahoma House of Representatives and A. E. Montgomery  of Tulsa as Speaker Pro Tempore.

Members

Senate

Table based on state almanac.

House of Representatives

Table based on government database.

References

Oklahoma legislative sessions
1941 in Oklahoma
1942 in Oklahoma
1941 U.S. legislative sessions
1942 U.S. legislative sessions